The A–Z Series is a series of singles released by Northern Irish rock band Ash. Consisting of 26 singles, each represented by a letter of the alphabet, the singles were first released on a fortnightly basis from 12 October 2009 until 27 September 2010 on 7-inch vinyl and by download. Along with the 26 primary singles the series also includes 21 B-sides, 13 remixes, 7 acoustic tracks and 2 live tracks which were sporadically released in various formats. The series was later released in various other formats, including two compilation CDs Volume 1 (singles A–M) released on 19 April 2010 and Volume 2 (singles N–Z) released on 11 October 2010, a compilation of all 26 tracks on three vinyl LPs was released on 6 November 2012 through Noyes Records and finally a compact cassette featuring 15 of the band's favourite tracks from the series was released for Cassette Store Day, titled Letters from Alphabet City.

The series spawned 6 radio singles; "Return of White Rabbit", "True Love 1980", "Space Shot", "War with Me", "Binary", and "Carnal Love".

Background and recording

Split from Infectious Records
The band's final conventional record, Twilight of the Innocents, was released on 29 June 2007. From this the band members themselves formed Atomic Heart Records, setting up headquarters in New York City, calling their new studio Atomic Heart. Band members Tim and Mark both moved to New York; "It was a dream of mine, ever since our first American tour in the mid-1990s, to live in New York", whilst drummer Rick resided in Edinburgh's Craiglockhart, commuting to the New York Studio on a regular basis and working in "intensive bursts". The announcement itself of the band's boycott on the album format came at the time of release for Twilight of the Innocents, which the band called "their final album"—sparking rumours over the possibility of Ash splitting up.

Recording at Atomic Heart Studio
Upon entering the studio, the band recorded "Survivor", later titled "Ichiban", "Coming Around Again" a cover of Carly Simon, a Beach Boys cover of "Do You Wanna Dance?". Soon after several early titles of tracks surfaced on the band's official website, including "Survivor"—now titled "Ichiban", "Prypiat" which was written originally for Twilight of the Innocents, however wasn't finished in time to make the album, "Return of White Rabbit" which at the time Tim Wheeler supposedly joked about being their comeback single, "Nouvelle Adventures" which features both Tim and Mark on bass guitar, "No Face (Jesus Christ)", "Daedalus", as well as "Hospital Song" and "Lay Down Your Arms" which were both originally intended for Twilight of the Innocents. Soon after more titles were leaked, including "Space Shot" and "Tracer (Without You)".

In NME, vocalist and guitarist Tim Wheeler stated "We wanted to be the first people to do it like this" also saying, "I think it'll be great for our fans waiting every two weeks knowing they're going to get a song and wondering what it'll be like. It'll be fun". Bassist Mark Hamilton also spoke of the merits of releasing in an alternative way; "we thought we'd come up with a different model where we never really had to be actually be away, that might work better. That was one of the reasons. We had the freedom when launching our own label as well, to try something different, so we're going to give it a go. I think if it works, a lot of people might copy it."

Artwork
Each single is assigned a specific colour and letter A–Z, prequel track "Return of White Rabbit" features the upside down stylized as ʁ, representing the rabbit. The front of each single simply shows the letter followed by the band's logo below, whilst on the back the track name is shown. The coloured artwork has also been used for the promotion of their A–Z Tour, with each colour representing a place and a letter of the alphabet, similarly the band through their forum  and the assistance of their webmaster have allowed fans to create their own avatars and use emoticons in the A–Z style. Almost all of the artwork for the series was created by Post 98 Design and Modo Productions, with the exception of the cassette Letters from Alphabet City which was created by Elisa Dalla Tor and handmade "Return of White Rabbit" and "War with Me" CD singles which were created by the band.

Release
The 26 singles of the A–Z Series were released once every two weeks through both digital download and 7" limited edition vinyl. The opening to the series was a free download "Return of White Rabbit", released on 18 May 2009, promoting the track were three music videos, an animated one created by Big Button, a home-made one — following the 'White Rabbit' around New York City, and a live footage video, filmed by fans at Thekla in Bristol. The first single to be announced for release was "True Love 1980", opening the series on 12 October 2009, with subscription to the series itself opening on 5 October 2009.

The band in October 2009 confirmed that only the first half of the A–Z Series were "set in stone", with mastering taking place, and the artwork, pressing and release dates confirmed, however the second half of the series would at the time be decided once the series had been launched, with the band holding a then total of 44 tracks recorded, and plans to re-enter the recording studio again in late 2009, "the first six months are set in stone, but the second half is still flexible. It's nice to have that kind of freedom".

Digital downloads
The digital subscription for the A–Z Series is offered worldwide, however the United Kingdom service differs to the rest of the world. The subscription service in the United Kingdom is provided by 7digital, with the fortnightly single released on a Monday, and other non-subscription UK downloads through 7digital, Amazon, Play.com, HMV, iTunes and other download services providing the tracks on the day before subscribers. The rest of the world service is provided by Topspin, the band have not used Topspin in the UK as they wanted each single to be chart eligible.

The digital subscription service was set to launch originally on 5 October 2009, however was delayed and launched two days later on 8 October 2009.
A free download of 'pre-A-Z' single "Return of White Rabbit" was launched digitally on 18 May 2009, whilst the A–Z Series was celebrated on 14 October by the release of the original 'extended mix' and an 'Atomic Heart' mix of "Return of White Rabbit", available for free download through sneakattackmedia.com.

Limited 7" vinyl

Subscription for the 7" singles opened on 6 October 2009; the vinyl, whilst costly for both the band and customer, was something the band demanded, as with previous singles whilst still signed, the band ensured all their singles were released on 7-inch vinyl. The singles were each limited to 1000 copies and were each collectors' items; the complete vinyl subscription cost £130, or £140 including a special box to store them all in. The vinyl subscription service was provided by Recordstore.co.uk, whilst other retailers would also be given a small number of the singles, to sell at each release. Steve Wheeler of Recordstore commented on the partnership with Ash as "being chosen by an innovative and popular band like Ash is testament to the quality service that Recordstore.co.uk provide forward-thinking labels and artists"

Compilation CD
The band released two compilation CDs of the series: Volume 1 covered the letters A-M and Volume 2 the letters N-Z. The compilations were released on CD, limited CD/DVD and digitally. Some fans criticized the band's choice to release a CD, pointing out its similarity to an album, but bassist Mark Hamilton responded that it was always their intention and it was about making the A–Z Series available for everyone.

On 24 February the Japanese version of Volume 1 was announced, featuring two disks, unlike the standard UK one-disc version, with the first disc holding the A–M singles and 7 B-sides; "Return of the White Rabbit", "Coming Around Again", "The Creeps", "CTRL-ALT-DEL", "Do You Feel It?" and exclusively "Kamakura" and "Disenchanted" with the second disc featuring 14 remixes, acoustics and already digitally released B-sides "Lay Down Your Arms" and "Gallows Hill". The CD was released earlier than the UK version, on 7 April 2010.

On 28 July 2010 RecordStore.co.uk announced the second compilation—A–Z Volume 2 for a release on 11 October 2010. The release unlike Volume 1 did not include any acoustic tracks, remixes or a DVD, and only had three bonus tracks as opposed to the previous five due to the length of Single Y "Sky Burial". The full track listing was revealed on 6 August 2010, with the three new B-sides being "Spellbound", "Nightfall" and David Bowie track "Teenage Wildlife". The Japanese Volume 2 also included two exclusive B-sides—"Running to the Ocean" and "Midnight in the Garden".

A is for Ash
A is for Ash is a film documentary of the band's A–Z 2009 tour from Aldershot to Zennor. It was directed by Josh Klezkin and produced by the members of Ash. The documentary features interviews from Tim Wheeler, Mark Hamilton and Rick McMurray of Ash, as well as featuring BBC DJ Steve Lamacq, Emmy The Great & Ian Wright amongst others, as well as live performances on the A–Z tour of Spaceshot and Arcadia, acoustic performances, the final days of recording the A–Z Series in New York and behind the scenes at some of the TV, radio and other media appearances.

The documentary was released onto Region 0 DVD, limited to 5000 copies, released on 19 April 2010 in the A–Z Volume 1 CD compilation.

During the course and after the A–Z tour the band released four short webisodes onto YouTube and NME.com, which acted as promotions for the complete documentary, featuring some footage that would be used in A Is For Ash, and some exclusive content. The trailer for the complete documentary was released on 3 March 2010.

Other releases
Amongst the core 26 singles were a large number of studio B-sides, which were sporadically released over the course of the A–Z Series. The first three radio singles from the A–Z Series—"Return of White Rabbit", "True Love 1980" and "Spaceshot"—were each accompanied by a digital EP—The Rehash EP and Space Reshot EP, both of which were collections of remixes by Snitch Brothers, Jaymo & Andy George, Pete Doyle, Timothy Allen, Loverush UK. An acoustic EP, featuring 7 of the A–Z singles, was also made available on 19 April 2010.

Promotion

Video
The band worked with a number of directors and companies to produce music videos for the A–Z Series, a selection of the singles—the radio singles were given higher budgets for promotion and consequently the band worked with such people as Nico Jones on "Return of White Rabbit" and "Binary"—who also directed the initial A–Z teaser trailer which previewed many of the upcoming singles. Director Daniel Garcia worked on the music videos for "True Love 1980" and "Space Shot" whilst Alex Turvey directed "Carnal Love" and Alex Beck directed "War with Me". Many of the non-radio singles also have low budget videos for them—Josh Kletzkin directed "Joy Kicks Darkness", "Arcadia" and "Tracers", KINo sequenced the video for "Neon", whilst singles such as "Pripyat" and "Ichiban" use material not specifically created for Ash.

From 7 October 2009 Ash used NME.com to host a four-part web series of tour videos, directed by Josh Kletzkin. The videos would serve as tasters for the DVD release 'A is for Ash'. Episode 1 featured rehearsals in London, behind the scenes at Live from Studio Five, amongst other interviews. Episode 2 shows the A–Z Tour, from Aldershot to Carlisle, with Episode 3 taking Dundee through to Jersey, and Episode 4 covering the remaining dates.

Competition
Throughout the A–Z Series the band orchestrated various competitions on both their NME content area and on their official website. One of the first competitions launched coincided with the release of"Return of White Rabbit", the band asked fans to come up with a back-story to the song's title, "where is the white rabbit returning from?"—which would then be judged by the band, with the winner receiving a rare "Return of White Rabbit" handmade promo CD. "Why has the White Rabbit been away?" was the basis for the second competition and the final of the three "Return of White Rabbit" competitions to win handmade promos asked fans to design White Rabbit related art/photos and videos.

The opportunity to win "True Love 1980" test 7"s and handmade "Return of White Rabbit" CD promos began with the release of "True Love 1980". Later in November, NME offered the chance to win more test prints of "True Love 1980", "Joy Kicks" and "Arcadia" followed in January 2010 with "Space Shot" test vinyl. NME also offered the chance to win a free subscription to the A–Z Series. Similarly a free subscription to the A-Z Series was offered every night of the A–Z Tour in 2009—with show fliers containing a unique code—a raffle would then take place and the winning flier holder would be given a free subscription—giving the fliers value.

Opportunities to win tickets to all varieties of Ash performances were also given—including exclusive radio sessions with Kerrang! Radio XFM and tickets for Absolute Radio on 15 April 2010—tickets were also offered in a Music-News.com competition. Festival appearances such as Hop farm festival and Truck Festival 2009. Tickets to dates on the 2009 A–Z tour were also offered, as well as 2010 European dates.

Merchandise competitions included a Valentines day t-shirt draw, a chance to win a "Return of White Rabbit" t-shirt, an exclusive limited Atomic Heart Studios staff t-shirt and the opportunity to design a t-shirt which would be sold throughout all of the 2010 shows around the world, and have their winning design sent to them in a special frame. Other creative competitions included remixing single "Binary" the band choose the Argyle Raver Pornographic as the winning remix, and to direct a music video for B-sides to the A–Z Series.

With the 2009 A–Z Tour the opportunity for a one-on-three meet and greet was given for fans similarly in 2010 the chance for fans to win a dinner-date with the band at any stop on the UK tour was given. On the same tour the chance for local bands to support Ash was given—asking that those interested emailed a Myspace link and list of gigs previously played.

Press attention
The band gained significant media attention surrounding the A–Z Series. With interviews and other coverage running through newspapers and magazines such as The Guardian, The Herald, M Is for Music, News of the World, Billboard, Kerrang!, NME, East Mag, TUFS, culturedeluxe.com, Sport.co.uk, Randomville, Media Wales, MusicRadar, Counteract Magazine, Stereoboard, and Bunch.tv.

Radio sessions and interviews included Kerrang!, XFM, Absolute, and BBC 6 Music. Televised appearances included appearances on Live from Studio Five broadcast on Five on 15 October 2009, BBC E24, The Friday Show, Children In Need and Sky Sports Soccer AM. Several songs of the A–Z Series were also used on various TV adverts—"Physical World" was used for BBC's coverage of the Formula 1 Qualifying, whilst "Spheres" was used on Film4 and "There Is Hope Again" was used during Sky Sports coverage of England vs Hungary on 11 August 2010.

Live

The band embarked on a 4 date UK tour consisting of performances at Brighton Concorde 2 on 3 June, Portsmouth Wedgewood Rooms the following day and two dates at the London Bloomsbury Ballroom on 6 and 7 June 2009. At the performances they showcased new material, including "Space Shot", "True Love 1980" and "Return of White Rabbit".

Most notably of the band's touring antics during the A–Z Series was their 2009 A–Z Tour. The tour consisted of 26 dates across the United Kingdom, with each tour location based around the alphabet, choosing towns, cities and villages which correspond with letters A–Z. The tour began in Aldershot and ended in Zennor, gaining significant press coverage because of its uniqueness. Planning the tour bassist Mark Hamilton told eastmagazine.co.uk that the band looked for alternatives to the usual places they would visit on tour; "We told our agent that we don't want to go to the cities we would usually hit on a regular tour. Then he came back with a bunch of dates, but he had quite a lot of work to do on this. But that was good; it was good to make him actually work." going on to say "There were a number of venues we told him to change, saying, 'We usually play there, so get us something different".

In 2009 the band also played dates in their native Ireland—Dublin and Belfast. It wasn't until March 2010 that the band began touring again, playing dates in Tokyo, Japan New York, USA and eventually onto a conventional UK tour circuit.

The band announced a full UK tour soon after, scheduled from 13 May 2010 in Paris, France through Amsterdam in the Netherlands, Cologne, Hamburg, Munich, Stuttgart, Frankfurt am Main, Neuhausen ob Eck and Berlin in Germany, Oslo in Norway, Aarhus in Denmark, Vienna in Austria, Zurich in Switzerland, Brussels in Belgium and ending at Hurricane Festival in Scheeßel on 20 June 2010. Parts of this tour were rescheduled, however the majority of dates were completely canceled, with the band citing personal reasons for this decision which they did not take lightly.

After originally being rumored to be playing a number of dates with The Automatic, it was instead announced that Ash and We Are Scientists would be playing a number of co-headline shows in Australia.

Reception

Singles A–M (Volume 1)

The first single from the series "Return of White Rabbit" received fairly mixed reactions, with the band showcasing a more unfamiliar electronic side of the band, however NME reacted positively "a weirdly effective funk-pop song" Kerrang! also praised the release saying; "they're only doing singles now, if this new humdigger of a tune is anything to go by, then it will be a decision well made" whilst The Irish Times rated the track 3/5, whilst The Times said regarding the single "...this revelatory rump-shaker, triggering pleasure sensors we didn't even know we had".

Bands such as New Found Glory and Young Guns have criticized the band in Rock Sound magazine, with New Found Glory posting an apology after Rock Sound supposedly twisted their words.

Mark Beaumont wrote on BBC Music "they've lost none of their melodic punch since Girl From Mars fell to Earth" and praised the consistency of singles A-M "the most remarkable thing about the A–Z project is that, thus far, every track really is worthy of being a single." David Welsh of MusicOMH poked fun at the similarities between the conventional album of compilation, however was very positive of the release as a whole "Their subsequent fresh approach and retreat from the album formula appears to have reinvigorated the Downpatrick threesome with a new sense of purpose and, quite curiously, resulted in one of the best albums of their long and illustrious career"

Paul Brown at Drowned in Sound described the release format as "While they haven't quite reinvented the wheel with these songs, they have certainly pumped up its tyres and given it some shiny new hubcaps", speaking with praise of singles A ("True Love 1980") through till H ("Space Shot"); "So great are the high points of the collection that it's a shame that it starts to run out of steam slightly towards the end", yet with final single of the half M ("War with Me") he believed it "revives things at the death with a grand piano motif and yet another mega chorus". Ben Walton of Contactmusic.com believed the singles lack of cohesion as a compilation was the A–Z Series main strength; "Ash have been set free to sprawl however they see fit across genre boundaries" going onto favor tracks such as "Arcadia" and "Neon", also calling "Dionysian Urge" "one of the best songs Ash have ever delivered".

Phil Mongredien of Q magazine criticized the similarity between a compilation of singles and the conventional album, writing; "it's not obvious how this format differs from the peaks and troughs of a regular album, high points largely canceled out by the more workaday material", however noted the albums merits as "Arcadia" and "Joy Kicks Darkness", Jon Bye of Gigwise.com was critical of the direction taken in some of the singles which use synthesizer parts advising the band to "stick to the rock and roll you're good at" however praised the synth laced "Arcadia", comparing it to Muse.

Singles N–Z (Volume 2)

Mark Griffiths of Kerrang! magazine rated the compilation of singles N-Z 4/5 praising "they've lost none of their melodic abrasive songwriting genius" recommending the highlights of the 2nd half to the series as "Sky Burial", "Binary" and "Physical World". Andy Fyfe of Q magazine recommended "Binary", "Dare to Dream" and "Carnal Love", rating it 3/5—the same rating given to Volume 1.

Sales and chart performance
As of December 2009 the vinyl subscription sold out, with only limited amounts of past and future singles available on the band's official website and other various stores. Despite much publicity, none of the singles reached the UK Top 40, with only "Instinct" reaching the UK Top 75, at No.65.  But the singles performed better on the UK Indie Singles Chart, with 15 of them reaching the top ten of that chart.

Releases
There is a total of 26 singles in the A–Z Series, and 21 B-sides. Not all of the singles are radio singles; the ones that are, were accompanied by a music video. The title of each release was revealed the Wednesday after the previous release and was referred to as 'Ash Wednesday'.

B-sides

Remixes

Acoustic

Live tracks

Personnel
Over the course of the A–Z Series Tim Wheeler took on much of the production work himself, assisted by Cladius Mittendorfer who worked with the band on previous albums "Meltdown" and "Twilight of the Innocence" as a studio engineer and later a producer, and Ash members Mark Hamilton and Rick McMurray. Musically the band collaborated with few others; a saxophone player–Daniel Rouleau on "Do You Feel It?" a B-side released on A–Z Volume 1, Pete Moses, James Levy and Eric Feigenbaum who provided backing vocals on "Return of White Rabbit" and "Ichiban", and later Emma-Lee Moss of Emmy The Great on an acoustic studio re-recording of single "D"–"Tracers".

Ash
 Tim Wheeler – Vocals, guitar, piano and programming
 Mark Hamilton – Bass, synthesizer, backing vocals on "Ichiban" and "Return of White Rabbit"
 Rick McMurray – Drums and percussion

Production
 Tim Wheeler – Producer, additional engineer
 Cladius Mittendorfer – Co-producer, engineer, mixing
 Mark Hamilton – Co-producer
 Rick McMurray – Co-producer
 Brain Thorn – Piano assistant
 Kabir Hermon – Piano assistant
 Mike Marsh – Mastering

Additional musicians
 Eric Feigenbaum – backing vocals on "Return of White Rabbit" and "Ichiban"
 James Levy – backing vocals on "Return of White Rabbit"
 Pete Moses – backing vocals on "Ichiban"
 Daniel Rouleau – saxophone on "Do You Feel It?"
 Emma-Lee Moss – guitar, vocals on "Tracers" (acoustic)

Art
 Nico Jones – A–Z Volume 1 photography
 Post 98 – A–Z Volume 1 design and layout
 Modo Production Ltd – A–Z Volume 1 design and layout
 Steve Timmis – web development and maintenance; digital distribution

Live
For 2009 live performances, many new tracks simply used a backing track, instead of enlisting another member, however the band had not ruled out either recruiting a completely new member, or reuniting with former guitarist Charlotte Hatherley in the future, with Tim stating "I do miss her as a friend on tour" as well as stating "It could be good to get someone in for extra guitar and keyboards and add some layers" whilst Charlotte in interview with NME simply said it would be a "possibility in the future" and that her and Tim regularly talk despite her having left the band in 2006.

Tim Wheeler and Emmy The Great performed the track "Tracers" acoustically on a number of occasions in 2009, and for the 2010 release of A–Z Volume 1 an acoustic re-recording of "Tracers" was included featuring Emma-Lee Moss. The collaboration came after Emmy The Great covered "Burn Baby Burn" as a B-side to the single "First Love", famously including the backing vocals "shit! You're a shit! You're not a shit! Lick my shit".

On 16 March Russell Lissack was announced as the band's touring guitarist and synthesizer player for their tour dates in New York, Japan and the United Kingdom, Tim Wheeler stated on the band's website; "We first met at the South By South West in 2005, we'd heard he and Kele Okereke met when Russell was playing Ash songs at a party, so we've always felt that connection with him. We've loved Bloc Party since their first single and have always really admired his guitar playing." This came after Russell's band Bloc Party went on hiatus at the end of 2009, NME quoted Russell saying "as soon as they called me I was really excited".

References

External links
 Official A–Z Page  on ash-official.com

Ash (band) albums
2009 singles
2010 singles